Ashapura Gomat railway station is a railway station in Jaisalmer district, Rajasthan. Its code is AQG. It serves Gomat. The station consists of 3 platforms. Passenger, Express, and Superfast trains halt here.

Trains

The following trains halt at Ashapura Gomat in both directions:

 Leelan Express
 Ranikhet Express
 Corbett Park Link Express
 Jaisalmer–Jodhpur Express
 Malani Express
 Jaisalmer–Lalgarh Express

References

Railway stations in Jaisalmer district
Jodhpur railway division